TV New (Malayalam: ടി വി ന്യൂ ) was an Indian television channel broadcasting in Malayalam, a brain child of Kerala Chamber of Commerce and Industry (KCCI). The headquarters is located at Padivattom, Kochi, Kerala, India.

The KCCI along with India Middle East Broadcasting Network started TV New. TV New mainly focuses on news and current affairs with special emphasis on business, knowledge and economical development of state.

References

Malayalam-language television channels
Television channels and stations established in 2014
Television stations in Thiruvananthapuram
2014 establishments in Kerala